Idol Tryouts is the second various artists compilation album released by Michigan-based label Ghostly International.  Unlike the label's previous sampler Disco Nouveau, Idol Tryouts contains music solely from artists signed to Ghostly International.  Musical genres represented here span techno, electro, electroclash and tech house.

Idol Tryouts track listing
 Dabrye "Making It Pay"
 Charles Mainer "At the Bottle"
 Midwest Product "Laundry"
 Midwest Product "A Genuine Display"
 Kill Memory Crash "Get Out"
 Matthew Dear "Some New Depression"
 Kiln "Ero"
 Dykehouse "Map Ref. 41° N 93° W"
 Osborne "Daylight (Radio)"
 James Cotton "Help Me Think of One"
 Outputmessage "Bernard's Song"
 Dabrye 73.3 "Prefuse 73 Megamix"

Record label compilation albums
2003 compilation albums
Ghostly International compilation albums
Electronic compilation albums
Dance music compilation albums